John Hunter is a Scottish-born Australian former footballer and coach.

Career

Hall of Fame

Enshrined into the Football Hall of Fame Western Australia Hall of Merit for Players category in 2016, Hunter helped Inglewood United claim the 1996 State Premier League title and coached them for two seasons.

Sarawak
Roped in to Sarawak from South China in early 1991, he was nicknamed "Kerbau", which means "Buffalo", in Malay due to his build and was one of the club's first foreign footballers.
Steering them to their first domestic trophy, the 1992 Malaysia FA Cup, the Australian was regarded by fans as the best foreign player to have ever represented Sarawak in its history, forming a strike partnership with Shamsurin Abdul Rahman.

A good reader of the game, the striker possessed a powerful header and left foot as well as his physical ability.

Returning to Sarawak for the 2017 Sarawak Glory Carnival along with Alan Vest, David Evans, and Alistair Edwards,  he contributed to the 10-3 defeat of Selangor FA veterans in favour of Sarawak with one goal and expressed gratefulness for the opportunity.

Honours

 Australian First Division (3): 1988, 1989, 1990
 D'Orsogna Cup (2)

References

External links
 John 'Kerbau - Buffalo' Hunter Fans Page

Year of birth missing (living people)
Living people
Australian people of Scottish descent
Australian soccer players
Association football forwards
Stirling Macedonia FC players
South China AA players
Sarawak FA players
Inglewood United FC players
Australian expatriate soccer players
Australian expatriate sportspeople in Hong Kong
Australian expatriate sportspeople in Malaysia
Expatriate footballers in Hong Kong
Expatriate footballers in Malaysia
Australian soccer coaches